afrol News is an independent news agency, established in 2000, that exclusively covers the African continent, publishing an online news portal in the English, French, Spanish and Portuguese languages.

Type of coverage
On 25 May 2010, the agency reported that about two million Chadians were at risk of having a famine occur in their regions after the combined effects of two years of drought and pestilence had ruined their harvest yet again.

References

External links
Official Website
General News World

African journalism
Mass media companies established in 2000
Mass media companies of Africa
Multilingual news services